Gwyn Edward Staley (July 6, 1927 – March 23, 1958) was an American NASCAR Grand National driver from Burlington, North Carolina.

Career
As a Grand National driver, Staley had three wins in addition to twenty-three finishes in the "top 5" and forty-one finishes in the "top 10."  Out of 10218 laps, he officially led 299 laps and accumulated a grand total of $23,284 ($ when adjusted for inflation) in his seven-year career.  Notable appearances for Staley have been at Hickory Motor Speedway (where he won the first race ever held there) and Langhorne Speedway (where he won a race in 1957 using a Chevrolet Bel Air vehicle).

Staley won three races driving the Julian-Petty-prepared 1957 Chevy Bel Air.  The first win was on August 26, 1957 at the Coastal Speedway in Myrtle Beach, South Carolina.  It was a 200-lap race and he had lapped the field.  The second win came a few weeks later on September the 5th.  It was at the New York State Fairgrounds and once again he had lapped the field driving the Petty prepared 1957 Chevy.  His third and last win came on September the 15th in the same car at the Langhorne Speedway in Pennsylvania.  He had the field lapped twice this time.  North Wilkesboro Speedway named the race after him during the early 1970s.

Staley's greatest successes came at road courses where his average finishes would be in ninth place.  His racing performance would be the worst on intermediate tracks where he would finish in a paltry 39th place.

Eight days after scoring a second-place finish in the 150-lap Grand National race at Champion Speedway in Fayetteville, North Carolina Staley was killed in a NASCAR Convertible Division 100-mile race held at the Atlantic Rural Fairgrounds in Richmond, Virginia in March 1958.

References

External links
 

1927 births
1958 deaths
People from Burlington, North Carolina
Racing drivers from North Carolina
NASCAR drivers
Racing drivers who died while racing
Sports deaths in Virginia
Burials in North Carolina